Heavrin is a surname of American origin. Notable people with the surname include:

 Amanda Heavrin, American individual in the murder of Shanda Sharer
 Samara Heavrin (born 1992), American politician

See also
 Hearing
 Heaven

Surnames of North American origin